Thakurwadi , Raypur Tanda, is a village in the Nanded of Maharashtra, India. It is located in the kinwat taluka.431805

Demographics 

According to the 2011 census of India, Thakurwadi has 203 households. The effective literacy rate (i.e. the literacy rate of population excluding children aged 6 and below) is 85.53%.

References 

Villages in Dahanu taluka